"Party Shaker" is a song by German dance-band R.I.O., featuring vocals from Nicco. It was released in Germany as a digital download on 18 May 2012. The song has charted in Austria, France, Netherlands and Switzerland. The track features a sample of Vengaboys 1999 hit "We Like to Party".

A music video to accompany the release of "Party Shaker" was first released onto YouTube on 15 May 2012 at a total length of three minutes and thirty-one seconds. It is Kontor Records' most viewed song on YouTube, having 247 million views.

Chart performance

Weekly charts

Year-end charts

Release history

References

2012 singles
R.I.O. songs
2011 songs
Kontor Records singles
Songs written by Andres Ballinas
Songs written by Yanou
Songs written by DJ Manian